Sazan is an Albanian uninhabited island in the Mediterranean Sea. The largest of Albania's islands, it is a designated military exclusion zone; it lies in a strategically important location between the Strait of Otranto and the mouth of the Bay of Vlorë, marking the border between the Adriatic and Ionian seas.

In 2010,  of the island's surrounding marine area was designated as the Karaburun-Sazan Marine Park. In clear weather, Sazan is sometimes visible from the coast of Salento, Italy, to its west. The island has been open to the public since July 2015.

History 

Sazan was known as Sason (Σάσων) to the ancient Greeks, and Saso to the ancient Romans. Pseudo Scylax mentioned it in the Periplus. And Polybius wrote that there had been a military encounter there in 215 BC between the forces of Philip V of Macedon and the Romans. The island was part of the Roman Empire, and later came under Byzantine rule. In 1279, it was captured by the Anjou of Naples, and in the 14th century it was held by Albanian lords, often under the protection of the Republic of Venice.

Around 1400, the Ottomans captured it, but by 1696 it was controlled by the Venetians. In 1815, it came under the protection of Britain along with the Ionian Islands, which were made an autonomous republic.

In 1864, the island was ceded to Greece along with the rest of the Ionian Islands. It was considered part of Diapontia Islands. But Greece did not occupy it, and it came under the de facto control of the Ottomans. It was not until the First Balkan War, in 1912, that Greece landed soldiers on the island and formally claimed it, calling it Sasona (Σάσωνα). After the end of the Second Balkan War in 1913, Italy and Austria-Hungary pressed Greece to evacuate the southern part of modern Albania and the island. Due to the risk of starting a war with Italy, Greece evacuated it.

Italy in turn occupied it on 30 October 1914, and established a military commander on the island, which is called Saseno in Italian. This was later ratified on 26 April 1915 by the secret Treaty of London. After World War I, Albania formally ceded the island to Italy on 2 September 1920 as part of the Albano-Italian protocol.

The island was part of Italy from 1920 until after World War II, administratively part of Lagosta, in the province of Zara. In those years the Italian authorities built a lighthouse and some naval fortifications, and populated the island with a few families of fishermen relocated from Apulia. The island was united to the Italian Governatorate of Dalmatia in 1941 during World War II and ceded to Albania on 10 February 1947, under the postwar peace treaty with Italy.

Post-World War II
During the Cold War between the Soviet Union and the United States, Albania relied heavily on the Soviet Union. During that time, the Soviets built a base for Whiskey-class submarines and a chemical/biological weapons plant on the island and surrounding areas. After the fall of communism four submarines remained at Pasha Limani port in the bay of Vlore . To this day, many Soviet-era gas masks can still be found scattered around the valley of the island.

The island now is uninhabited but there is a small Italo-Albanian naval base, used mainly to counter contraband between southern Italy and Albania and as a training field for the British Royal Navy. In 2010, the island's surrounding sea waters, and those of adjacent Karaburun Peninsula were proclaimed a National Marine Park by the Albanian government.

Environment

Geography and climate 

Sazan is the largest island in the country and Albania's westernmost point. It is strategically located at the entrance to the Bay of Vlorë, in the eastern Strait of Otranto separating Italy from Albania. It is also located at the informal junction line of the Adriatic and Ionian Sea inside the Mediterranean Sea, which is just to the south according to international scientific bodies.

The island is composed of limestone rocks, which was formed during the Cretaceous period, while the eastern part is partially composed of terrigenic and cleistogenic deposits. Sazan has a coastline of about  characterized by sandy beaches, capes, rocky cliffs and underwater fauna. Along its western shore the cliffs descending up to  underwater. Capes of the island include the Bay of Paradise (Gjiri i Parajsës), Bay of St. Nicholas (Gjiri i Shënkollit), Cape of Shënkoll, Cape of Kallam, Cape of Jug, Cape of Pëllumba, and Cape of Pulbardha.

The island has a climate unusual in Albania, due to its maritime location. It is not mediterranean but rather subtropical on account of its warm winters and hot summers. The climate and vegetation resemble those of the south of Crete in Greece, Tunisia and even parts of Egypt. The flora is different from that of the rest of Albania in that it is subtropical. A small tornado or waterspout was spotted along the coast coming inland in August 2002.

Flora and fauna 

Biogeographically, Sazan Island falls within the Illyrian deciduous forests terrestrial ecoregion of the Palearctic Mediterranean forests, woodlands, and scrub. Due to the combination of southern geographic latitude and high altitude and as well the variation of climate, geological and hydrological conditions have contributed to the formation of a unique flora inside the island.

The variety of flora and vegetation can be explained by its strategically position between the western and eastern Mediterranean Sea. The island is home to 435 species (419 indigenous) of vascular plants, or 8.2% of Albania's entire vascular flora. There are only an endemic (Limonium anfractum) and 3 subendemic (Centaurea pawlowski, Scutellaria rupestris and Verbascum guicciardini) plants. The varied relief creates various ecological environments for plants, further diversified by the dominant rock types which form siliceous and calcareous terrain on the territory of the park. The rocky shores and limestone sea cliffs on the southern corners of Sazan are home to numerous halophile species such as lotus cytisoides and limonium anfractum. The forests of Sazan are generally composed of shrubs, sclerophyll forests with holm oak, deciduous forests with hophornbeam and south European flowering ash.

Due to its specific topography, climatic, hydrological and geological conditions, the island is characterized by housing a unique vegetation and biodiversity. The fauna is represented by 15 species of mammals (including 8 species of bats such as the common pipistrelle, and soprano pipistrelle), 39 species of birds, 8 species of reptiles, 1 species of amphibia and as well as 122 species of invertebrates. The bird species in Sazan with high conservation value include 23 songbirds, 5 bird of preys, 3 pigeons, and 3 swifts.

The amphibians are represented by 1 of which include the green toad nesting in the wet deciduous forests and the forest streams. There are 8 reptile species. The Mediterranean house gecko, testudo hermanni boettgeri, Balkan pond turtle, sheltopusik, blue-throated keeled lizard, Balkan wall lizard, Montpellier snake and Balkan whip snake are present in most rocky, and wet natural habitats throughout the island.

There are between 122 identified species, including 113 insects, but their actual number is estimated to be higher. Among the insects are 40 are beetles, 16 butterflies, 22 heteroptera, 20 orthoptera, 5 dragonflies and 10 hymenoptera.

See also 

 Geography of Albania
 Islands of Albania
 Karaburun-Sazan National Marine Park
 Albanian Adriatic and Ionian Sea Coast

References 

Islands of Albania
Uninhabited islands of Albania
Vlorë County
Geography of Vlorë County
Tourist attractions in Vlorë County
Islands of the Adriatic Sea
Important Bird Areas of Albania
History of the Ionian Islands
Karaburun-Sazan Marine Park